Buoni o cattivi is the fourteenth studio album by Italian singer-songwriter Vasco Rossi, released on 2 April 2004.

The album spent fifteen non-consecutive weeks atop the Italian FIMI Albums Chart, and later became Italy's best-selling album of 2004. It also entered the charts in Switzerland, peaking at number 6 and being certified gold in the country.

It spawned the singles "Buoni o cattivi", "Come stai", "Un senso", "E…" and "Señorita". "Un senso" also appeared on the soundtrack of the film Non ti muovere by Sergio Castellitto. Despite not being included in the film's official soundtrack, "Un senso" was awarded a Nastro d'Argento for Best Original Song in 2005.

Track listing

Personnel
Adapted from Buoni o cattivi's liner notes.

Production

 Antonio Baglio – mastering 
 Luca Bignardi – mixing (3, 5, 9, 12), engineer (3, 5, 9, 12)
 Marco Borsatti – assistant (3, 5, 9, 12) 
 Guido Elmi – producer
 Floriano Fini – executive producer
 Enrico "Flint" Mambella – assistant (3, 5, 9, 12)
 Vasco Rossi – producer
 Davide Roveri – assistant (3, 5, 9, 12)
 Jaime Sickora – assistant (3, 5, 9, 12)
 Michael Tacci – engineer (3, 5, 9, 12)
 Mark Valentine – assistant (3, 5, 9, 12)
 Celso Valli – co-producer (3, 5, 9, 12)
 Nicola Venieri – mixing (1−2, 4, 6−8, 10−11), engineer (1−12)

Music

 Luca Bignardi – programming (3, 5, 9, 12) 
 Nando Bonini – background vocals (1−2, 4, 6, 8, 11)
 Stef Burns – electric guitar (1−2, 4−8, 10−12), solo guitar (2, 7), acoustic guitar (5), guitar (8)
 Paul Bushnell – bass (8)
 Giacomo Castellano – electric guitars (5, 12)
 Vinnie Colaiuta – drums (1−12)
 Larry Corbett – cello
 Bruce Dukov – violin
 Guido Elmi – arrangements (1−2, 4, 6−8, 10−11), harpsichord (1, 2), congas (5), electric guitar (8), drums (11)
 Tony Franklin – bass (1, 3−4, 6, 8, 11)
 Andrea Innesto – wind instruments (11)
 Suzie Katayama – orchestra conductor
 Michael Landau – electric guitar (2, 4, 8, 12), guitars (3), solo guitar (4)
 Clara Moroni – background vocals (1−2, 4, 6, 8, 11)
 Frank Nemola – programming (1, 2, 4, 6, 7, 10−11), keyboards (1, 2, 4, 6−8, 10), string arrangements (2, 4, 7, 10), background vocals (4, 8), arrangements (6, 7, 10), wind instruments (11)
 Dean Parks – acoustic guitar (1, 2, 4, 6, 10)
 Tim Pierce – electric guitar (1, 2, 4, 6, 7), solo guitar (6)
 Silvio Pozzoli – background vocals (1−2, 4, 6, 8, 11)
 Alberto Rocchetti – Hammond (11)
 Vasco Rossi − vocals (1−12)
 Lee Sklar – bass (2, 4−5, 7, 9, 10, 12)
 Maurizio Solieri – electric guitar (11) 
 Michael Thompson – electric guitar (1, 2, 4, 6, 10)
 Celso Valli – Hammond (2, 7, 9), string conductor (2−5, 7, 9, 10, 12), string arrangements (3, 5, 9, 12), arrangements (3, 5, 12), keyboards (3, 5, 9, 12), electric bass (5), piano (9, 12)
 Patrick Warren – piano (6)
 Evan Wilson – viola

Charts

Weekly charts

Annual charts

Certifications and sales

References

2014 albums
Vasco Rossi albums
Italian-language albums
EMI Records albums